The Peking Hotel is a building in Moscow which houses a four-star hotel and an office complex. The building, which was designed in the Stalinist classicism style, was constructed between 1939 and 1955. It is located in the city center at the intersection of the Garden Ring and Tverskaya Street. Designed by prominent Soviet architect Dmitry Chechulin, the hotel was originally intended to commemorate Sino-Soviet friendship, but by the time it was completed, the relationship between two nations had gone cold.

Peking Hotel, which is owned by Sistema, is located at Bol'shaya Sadovaya Ulitsa, 5 in Moscow. Oleg Kuznetsov was the hotel administrator from 2002 to 2016.

In 2011, it was announced that the hotel would be renovated as a luxury hotel and would reopen in 2017, managed by Fairmont Hotels as the Fairmont Pekin Moscow. The renovation and rebranding never happened, however.

See also
 Moscow RestaurantSoviet restaurant built in Beijing as part of the same project

References

External links
Peking Hotel official website

Hotels in Moscow
Tourist attractions in Moscow
Hotel buildings completed in 1955
Hotels established in 1955
Stalinist architecture
1955 establishments in Russia
Cultural heritage monuments of regional significance in Moscow
Hotels built in the Soviet Union